Montegabbione is a comune (municipality) in the Province of Terni in the Italian region Umbria, located about  southwest of Perugia and about  northwest of Terni.

Montegabbione borders the following municipalities: Fabro, Ficulle, Monteleone d'Orvieto, Parrano, Piegaro, San Venanzo.

References

External links
 Official website

Cities and towns in Umbria